Diego Alfonzo Luna Flores (born 2 January 2000) is a Venezuelan football player who plays as defender for Deportivo La Guaira in Venezuelan Primera División.

Career

Club career
Luna played his younger years at LALA FC before later joining Deportivo La Guaira. In January 2020, Luna was loaned out to Spanish Tercera División club RSD Alcalá.

References

External links

2000 births
Living people
Venezuelan footballers
Venezuelan expatriate footballers
Venezuelan Primera División players
Deportivo La Guaira players
Tercera División players
RSD Alcalá players
Association football defenders
Venezuelan expatriate sportspeople in Spain
Expatriate footballers in Spain
People from Ciudad Bolívar
21st-century Venezuelan people